John Hagan Pryce Bayley FRS (born 13 February 1951) is a British scientist, who holds the position of Professor of Chemical Biology at the University of Oxford.

Life and education
Bayley was educated at The King's School, Chester, Balliol College, Oxford and Harvard University, where he was awarded a PhD in 1979.

Originally from Wales, spent much of his early career between the United Kingdom and the United States.

Research
Bayley's research is largely based on the study and engineering of transmembrane pore-forming proteins, as well as interests in chemical signal transduction and biomolecular materials. He is the co-founder of Oxford Nanopore Technologies Ltd. Bayley's research includes work on the pore-forming protein alpha haemolysin engineered for sensing has been highly cited.

Career
Following his PhD, Bayley completed postdoctoral research at Massachusetts Institute of Technology. He previously held appointments at Columbia University, University of Massachusetts Medical School, and Texas A&M University. Bayley has been based at the University of Oxford since 2003 and is a fellow of Hertford College, Oxford.

Awards and honours
Bayley was elected a Fellow of the Royal Society in 2011. His nomination reads 

The Science Council recognised him as "one of the UK's 100 leading practising scientists" of 2014.

References

Living people
British chemists
British nanotechnologists
Alumni of Balliol College, Oxford
Harvard University alumni
Fellows of Hertford College, Oxford
Fellows of the Royal Society
Massachusetts Institute of Technology faculty
Columbia University faculty
Texas A&M University faculty
1951 births
People educated at The King's School, Chester